Li Xinmo (born April 21,1976 in Yilan County, Heilongjiang) is a Chinese feminist artist, art critic, and teacher. She graduated from the Department of Chinese Painting, and received her master's degree from Tianjin Academy of Fine Arts in 2008 and now resides in Beijing. She is a member of the German IO culture institution, vice president of Chinese and Germany culture communication organization. Li is mainly devoted to feminist theory and contemporary art criticism research. Her creation involves a series of issues such as gender, ethnicity, environment, and national politics. Her artworks are based on a variety of media, especially performance, photography and painting. Her works have been exhibited in major art galleries such as the Louvre in France, the National Museums of World Culture in Gothenburg, Sweden, and the Bonn Women's Museum in Germany. She also participated in Toronto Photo Biennial and Prague Art Biennial. Many museums such as the Taida Museum and the Museum of Far Eastern Antiquities in Sweden have some of her works.

Early life 
Li was born in 1976 in a traditional Chinese patriarchal family, and grew up in Heilongjiang Province in northern China. Xinmo once told that she grew up in a violent family in an interview. What's more, she studied calligraphy from an early age.

Education and early career 
Li graduated from Art Education Department of Harbin Normal University in 1997 and taught at a private university for half a year. From 2005 to 2008, she was a graduate student of the Chinese Painting Department of the Tianjin Academy of Fine Arts and a lecturer at the School of Modern Art of Tianjin Academy Fine Arts. Currently living in Beijing, she teaches at the School of Modern Art at Beijing Geely University.

Exhibitions  

 "Excluded", Xinmo Li, Solo Exhibition, Kaiser & Cream Art District, Wiesbaden, Germany, March 2015.
 “In Another Place, And Here”, Exhibition, Art Gallery of Greater Victoria, Canada, 2015.
 “Guangzhou Live 5”, International action art event, Guangzhou Xiaozhou, China, 2014.
 “Bald Girls - Pink Solution”, Exhibition, Lia Contemporary Art, Colombia, 2014.
 “Switch”, Contemporary Art Exhibition, Xian Contemporary Museum, Xian, China, 2014.
 “Through The Body”, A primary exhibition of Contact Photography Festival, University of Toronto Art Centre, Toronto, Canada, 2014.
 “Single Mother”, Exhibition, Frauenmuseum, Bonn, Germany, January 2014.
 “Different Body”, Exhibition, Haian 523, Jiangsu Province, China, 2013.
 “ Bald Girls - A door”, Zajialab, Beijing, China, 2013.
 “Secret Love”, Exhibition, National Museums of World Cultur, Gothenburg, Sweden, 2013.
 “Bald Girls Exhibition of Xiaolu Lixinmo and Lanjing”, Iberia Center for Contemporary Art, Beijing, China, 2012.
 “100 Anniversary Of Chinese Ink-Painting”, Exhibition, Louvre, France, 2012.
 “UN Forbidden City”, Macro, Rome, Italy, 2012.
 “Li Xinmo + Qingshuihuimei”, Performance Art Exhibition, Dingshun Contemporary Art Space, Beijing, China, 2011.
 “Oaths of Love”, Photography Exhibition, Wenjin International Gallery, Beijing, China, 2011.
 “Solo Exhibition” by Li Xinmo, Tense Space, Beijing, China, 2011.
 “An Archive of Contemporary Video Art in 2010”, Songzhuang Art Center, Beijing, China, 2010.
 “Collaboration - Contemporary Works of Video and Performance Art Exhibition”, Beijing, China, 2009.
 “Xi’an International Contemporary Art Fair Participant”, Xi’an Art Museum, Xi’an, China, 2009.
 “Changing Directions and Interconnections”, Contemporary Ink Painting Exhibition, Huantie Time Art Museum, Beijing, China, 2009.
 “Great Works of Chinese Oil Painting Exhibition”, China Central Place, Beijing, China, 2009.
 “21st Century Invitational Ink- Painting Exhibition”, Art Museum of China, Beijing, China, 2008.
 “Participant in an Italian Video Art Performance”, Yuanfen Gallery, Beijing, China, 2008.
 “Beijing Dadao Live Arts Festival”, Yu Gallery, Beijing, China, 2008.
 “Exhibition of International Contemporary Art”, Beijing Sunshine Art Gallery, Beijing, China, 2008.
 “Major Exhibition of Young Artists”, Shanghai Duolun Museum of Modern Art, Shanghai, China, 2008.

Art Work 
“Memory of Vagina” is one piece of art which targeting on the patriarchy society. Using a gun to describe the patriarchy society and visualized the damage to women from the community. This work is an example of how the invisible violence from the community has been materialized in the modern art.

"I am 5 Years old" this performance piece was based on the story of a 5 year old girl who was sexually assaulted by her father. Li put a razor blade into her mouth, and began to tell the story of the little girl. Li was unable to speak clearly with the blade in her mouth, with every word the blade made a cut. This performance was painful. Which represents how painful it was for the young girl to talk about the abuse and how talking about it brought her more suffering. 

"Free" Li stands in front of an audience and have them put clips all over her body. She then commands them to "pull", the audience pulls and all the clips release from her body. Li experience great pain, but her body is released.

Barriers 
Even though Xinmo Li's art work has been accepted by many Western country, the impact of her idea and art has not been promoted to the public domestically. The conflicts between traditional Chinese culture and performance art have natively affect many feminist arts in China. Most feminists who use modern art to propose their idea to protect the rights for women are not accepted by the public.

References

External links
Li Xinmo's blog

1976 births
Living people
20th-century Chinese women artists
20th-century Chinese artists
21st-century Chinese women artists
21st-century Chinese artists
Tianjin University alumni
Feminist artists
Ecofeminism
Artists from Heilongjiang
Harbin Normal University alumni
Chinese feminists
21st-century Chinese women